Puchkayuq (Quechua puchka spindle, -yuq a suffix, "the one with a spindle", also spelled Pushcayoc) is a mountain in the Andes of Peru which reaches a height of approximately . It is located in the Huánuco Region, Huacaybamba Province, Cochabamba District.

References

Mountains of Peru
Mountains of Huánuco Region